Giancarlo Judica Cordiglia (born 30 September 1971) is an Italian  actor and entertainer perhaps best known for his role in the television program Melevisione on Raitre (as Gnomo Ronfo) and his roles in RIS Delitti Imperfetti (as Capt. Bruno Corsini) films on Canale 5.

References

External links 

IMDb entry 

1971 births
Italian male film actors
Italian stand-up comedians
Italian male television actors
Living people
People from the Province of Turin